James Gang was an American rock band formed in Cleveland, Ohio, in 1966. The band went through a variety of line-up changes until they recorded their first album as a power trio consisting of Joe Walsh (guitars, lead vocals), Tom Kriss (bass), and Jim Fox (drums). Dale Peters replaced Kriss on bass for the band's second and third albums. Two of the band's songs, "Funk #49" and "Walk Away", continue to be popular on classic rock and AOR stations.

In late 1971, Walsh left to pursue a solo career and would later join the Eagles. The band carried on with a number of other guitarists and lead singers to replace Walsh, but it failed to produce a hit song over the course of six more studio albums. It broke up in 1977. Several incarnations have reformed for reunions since then. On September 3, 2022, the band's power trio returned for a performance at the Taylor Hawkins Tribute Concert held in Wembley Stadium.

History

Early years 
Drummer Jim Fox first played with the Cleveland-area band the Outsiders but left them in 1965 to attend college. After they had a national hit the following year with "Time Won't Let Me", Fox returned temporarily to play with them after their drummer was drafted. After leaving them again to return to school, Fox, heavily influenced by the sound of British Invasion bands such as the Beatles, the Who and the Yardbirds, began to think about forming his own band and teamed up with schoolmate Ronnie Silverman (guitar), bassist Tom Kriss and keyboardist Phil Giallombardo in 1966.

The James Gang's earliest lineup consisted of Fox (drums), Kriss (bass), Silverman (guitar), Giallombardo (vocals, keyboards), and after auditioning some 25 candidates for lead guitar, the band decided to go with Greg Grandillo, who later played with another popular Cleveland band, Rainbow Canyon. He was soon replaced by Dennis Chandler, who was then succeeded by John "Mouse" Michalski who, with the Count Five, had just enjoyed a national hit with "Psychotic Reaction".

A short time later, Fox was invited to audition for a nine-piece rhythm and blues band that was being assembled. Fox initially declined the offer but changed his mind when he heard that local guitar legend Glenn Schwartz, who was fresh out of the army, was to be in attendance. After hearing Schwartz play, and hearing that two of his influences were the Spencer Davis Group and Jeff Beck, Fox was impressed and invited Schwartz to join the James Gang. However, Michalski was not as enthused by Glenn's playing as Fox and left the band immediately. Ronnie Silverman soon departed as well to enter the military. Bill Jeric was then brought in to play alongside Schwartz. No recordings were ever released by these early lineups of the band.

Around Christmastime of 1967, Schwartz, who was found to be AWOL from the army and was breaking up with his wife, decided to leave the band and move to California, where he ended up forming the band Pacific Gas & Electric.

Joe Walsh years
Just days later, shortly after the new year of 1968, a friend of Schwartz's, Joe Walsh (from a band called The Measles), knocked on Fox's door and asked to be given a tryout as Glenn's replacement. Walsh was accepted and the band continued as a five piece for a short time until Giallombardo, who was still in high school at the time, left. Jeric and Walsh worked together on guitar parts, but in the spring of 1968, Jeric ended up leaving as well. He was replaced by a returning Ronnie Silverman, who had been discharged from the military.

On Sunday June 9, 1968, the group played a concert in Detroit at the Grande Ballroom opening for Cream. At the last minute, Silverman informed the others that he would not be joining them at the show. The band, desperately in need of the money, took to the stage as a trio. They liked their sound as a threesome and decided to remain that way.

In 1968, the band signed with manager Mark Barger, who was handling the career of a fellow Ohio band, the Lemon Pipers, who had just scored a big hit with "Green Tambourine". Barger put the Gang in touch with ABC Records staff producer Bill Szymczyk, who got them signed to ABC's new Bluesway Records subsidiary in January 1969.

In March 1969, the band, now consisting of Fox, Kriss and Walsh and produced by Szymczyk, released its debut LP, Yer' Album.

Later in 1969, Szymczyk was music coordinator for the George Englund movie Zachariah (which was released in 1971), based on the 1922 novel Siddhartha by writer Hermann Hesse. Szymczyk arranged for the band to appear in the movie, with two James Gang songs, "Laguna Salada" and "Country Fever", also being used. For the recording of these two songs, vocalist Kenny Weiss, a friend of Fox's, was brought in to allow Walsh to focus on his guitar playing. However, Weiss was gone by the time the group arrived in Mexico to film their scenes in the movie. "Laguna Salada" and "Country Fever" later reappeared as bonus tracks on the 2000 re-release of The James Gang Greatest Hits.

In November 1969, bassist Tom Kriss left the band after his father, George, was diagnosed with lung cancer after he had worked for Alcoa for years, where he was likely exposed to various industrial carcinogens involved in the production of aluminium. Kriss was replaced by Dale Peters, who was brought in from another group called Case of E.T. Hooley. Kriss also died from cancer on May 6, 2013, at age 63.

In 1969, Roger Abramson went to JB's, a small club in Kent, Ohio, and advised Belkin Productions to start a Management division with the James Gang and the band Silk, which included Michael Stanley.

In July 1970, the band released its second album, James Gang Rides Again, which included the popular single "Funk #49."

In the spring of 1970, Belkin Productions arranged for the band to open for the Who for six dates during a US tour and their guitarist Pete Townshend was so impressed with them he invited the band to open for him on their fall tour of the United Kingdom. Townshend and Joe Walsh then started a long friendship with Pete telling Rolling Stone that Joe was the best American guitar player. In January 1971 they appeared on Top of the Pops in the United Kingdom.

In July 1971, the Gang returned to tour Europe. During their heyday, the band also shared the stage with artists like Grand Funk Railroad, Kinks, Humble Pie, Three Dog Night and Led Zeppelin.

But after two more albums, 1971's Thirds, and the live album James Gang Live in Concert released later that same year, Walsh, who was tired of the pressure of doing most of the writing and singing and being the only melodic instrument in the trio, left the band in December 1971. He relocated to the mountains of Colorado and eventually formed Barnstorm.

Post-Walsh 1970s
Peters and Fox carried on with vocalist Roy Kenner and guitarist Domenic Troiano (both ex-members of the Canadian band Bush) for two albums, Straight Shooter and Passin' Thru, both released in 1972. But in recent interviews, Fox stated that things did not work out musically with Troiano as hoped, so Troiano left the band in 1973 and would subsequently join the Guess Who.

Troiano was replaced by future Deep Purple guitarist Tommy Bolin after Joe Walsh called to recommend him to the band. Bolin joined the band in August 1973 and appeared on two albums, Bang! and Miami, that saw the band moving from ABC Records over to Atlantic Records' Atco label.

During the recording of Miami in 1974, Kenner ran into legal troubles after a drug bust and was not available initially for recording. Other singers were reportedly auditioned but eventually Kenner was able to return to complete the album. Not happy with the musical direction, and frustrated with the indifference from Bolin concerning new material, Kenner gave notice, telling Fox and Peters he would stay on until a replacement was found. Aware of this development, a disillusioned Bolin decided to leave as well, albeit in a slightly different manner: no notice, and simply not showing up for the gig. Bolin went on to work with Dr. John and Alphonse Mouzon and attempted to form another group with future Crosby, Stills and Nash keyboardist Mike Finnigan before accepting the offer from Deep Purple in 1975.

After Kenner's departure he later joined Ohio based band "LAW", followed by a stint with Troiano, then some solo projects, and many years doing voice-over sessions. After Kenner and Bolin's exit, the band went over to England to look for a new guitar player. Jimmy McCulloch (ex-Thunderclap Newman) expressed interest in joining but was committed to Paul McCartney's Wings. The group returned home dejected.

By early 1975, Fox and Peters decided to try again with a new lineup that included Fox's old friends, vocalist Bubba Keith, who had been playing out in LA with a band called Uncle Tom and guitarist Richard Shack who had previously played in the band Case of E.T. Hooley with Peters. This lineup recorded the album Newborn, which featured a cover of the Elvis Presley staple "Heartbreak Hotel".
The band released a final recording, Jesse Come Home, in February 1976, which featured the return of early member Phil Giallombardo, who rejoined along with new guitarist/vocalist Bob Webb (who, like Joe Walsh, had played in the group The Measles).

Ultimately, none of the post-Walsh lineups achieved the level of success enjoyed in their early 1970s heyday. Drummer Fox was the only remaining member of the original band when James Gang finally disbanded early in 1977.

Later years 

In a 1998 Chris Welch interview, Fox talks of the Gang's final years and the breakup: "It became a quest to find a suitable replacement for Joe Walsh. We'd try some guys and do an album or two, but it wasn't quite what we wanted and so we'd move on to something else in the hope of recapturing the old spirit. Some of the albums were good but we were always looking to find that particular thing we had with Joe and I don't think we ever found it again. So, after all those changes, Dale and I just talked one day and said 'Enough's enough'. That's when we decided to let it go. I never aspired to start another band. Instead I decided to take six months off and see what happened. If John Lennon called I'd see about it. That was my attitude. I wasn't looking to start up again."

After James Gang broke up, Fox was involved for a time with the Belkin management firm, who handled the affairs for artists like Michael Stanley Band, Wild Cherry and Donnie Iris. As for other latter day Gang members, Bubba Keith went on to play for England Dan & John Ford Coley and was later the lead vocalist for Point Blank, while Bob Webb played in Jay Ferguson's band.

The "classic" lineup of the band consisting of Walsh, Peters and Fox first reunited in July 1991 at Nautica Pavilion in Cleveland when Fox and Peters took to the stage during a Walsh concert to play three songs. The trio then gathered together again to perform at an election rally for President Bill Clinton at the Cleveland State University Convocation Center on November 4, 1996. They also appeared on The Drew Carey Show in the 1998–99 season and at the Rock and Roll Hall of Fame and the Allen Theater in Cleveland for three shows in February 2001, joined by keyboardist Mark Avsec (ex-Wild Cherry and Donnie Iris & the Cruisers). And in the summer of 2005, the group performed another handful of shows (joined again by Avsec) in the Cleveland area.

As of May 2004, Glenn Schwartz was playing guitar and singing Thursday nights at "Major Hooples" in the Flats, Cleveland. And as of 2014, Schwartz continued to perform at the Beachland Ballroom in Cleveland. Schwartz died on November 3, 2018, at the age of 77.

In April 2006, it was announced that the Walsh/Peters/Fox lineup of the group would be touring the United States later that summer, supported by keyboardist Bill Appleberry and backing vocalists Gia Ciambetti, Robbyn Kirmsse and Stacy Michelle. During this summer tour, the band appeared in August performing live on The Howard Stern Show on Sirius Satellite Radio.

In March 2012, it was stated on ultimateclassicrock.com that Walsh was in the Cleveland-area Lava Room Recording Studios with Fox and Peters, working on new recordings of their well-known James Gang tracks, with longtime friends Joe Vitale and Michael Stanley contributing. Since this time, however, nothing more has been heard about this, probably due to Walsh's ongoing busy schedule with the Eagles.

In August 2022, it was announced that the band would play two shows for the Taylor Hawkins tribute concerts. The shows were scheduled for September 3 at Wembley Stadium and September 27 at the Kia Forum

The James Gang participated in their first in-store signing event in over 50 years on November 8, 2022, at Used Kids Records in Columbus, Ohio.  After a brief interview, Jimmy Fox, Joe Walsh and Dale Peters signed autographs at the store, which is located just a few blocks from Walsh’s childhood home.  Proceeds from the event raised funds for various veterans-related organizations via Walsh’s VetsAid charity.

On November 13, 2022, the group performed at the VetsAid concert in Columbus, Ohio. There were early reports that VetsAid would be a final gig for the James Gang, but Joe Walsh said that may not be the case. “Glenn Frey used to say never say never, so I’m not,” Walsh explained. “We played the concerts for Taylor Hawkins and it worked really good; we got in front of an audience and we were able to do what we used to do. I haven’t played loud on 11 in a long time; I play in a vocal group, so I have small amps. It’s different to turn it up and go for it, and I didn’t realize how much I missed it until we started cookin’ with the James Gang. I can’t wait to play again.”

Discography 
Studio albums

Live album

Compilations

Singles

Band members

Final lineup
Jimmy Fox – drums, percussion, keyboards, backing vocals 
Joe Walsh – guitar, keyboards, lead vocals 
Dale Peters – bass, percussion, backing vocals

References

Further reading 
Wolff, Carlo (2006). Cleveland Rock and Roll Memories. Cleveland, OH: Gray & Company, Publishers.

External links 
 IMDb James Gang
 

Musical groups established in 1966
Musical groups disestablished in 1977
Musical groups from Cleveland
Rock music groups from Ohio
Atco Records artists
American hard rock musical groups
Musical groups from Ohio
1966 establishments in Ohio
1977 disestablishments in Ohio